R-10 regional road (previously known as R-4 regional road) is a Montenegrin roadway.

Route of the road starts near Đurđevića Tara Bridge and then follows Tara river up to Mojkovac.

History

In January 2016, the Ministry of Transport and Maritime Affairs published bylaw on categorisation of state roads. With new categorisation, R-4 regional road was renamed as R-10 regional road.

Major intersections

References

R-10